Government Mappillai is a 1992 Indian Tamil language drama film directed Manivannan. The film stars Anandaraj and Kasthuri. It was released on 6 March 1992.

Plot

Sundarapandian, an angry orphan, is the henchman of a rich man Manivannan and often went to jail for minor offences. Karthikeyan enters his house as a servant and falls in love with his daughter Kalyani. In the meantime, Mallaria, an orphan, tries to reform Sundarapandian and they fall in love with each other. One day, a poor girl Chellayi is raped and killed by a corrupted MLA. Sundarapandian and Mallaria finally get married, they decide to leave the village but they don't have enough money. Manivannan prepares his daughter's wedding with the MLA and Manivannan orders Sundarapandian to kill the innocent Karthikeyan. Sundarapandian, who is now a good man, decide to join the young pair. What transpires later forms the crux of the story.

Cast

Anandaraj as Sundarapandian
Kasthuri as Mallaria
Ramkumar as Karthikeyan
Saradha Preetha as Kalyani
Manivannan as Manivannan
Senthil as Chokka
Delhi Ganesh as Karthikeyan's father
Vasu Vikram as MLA
Ponvannan
Vasudevan
Periya Karuppu Thevar
Kennedy
Ragasudha as Chellayi
Vijayadurga as Arukkani
Janaki as Karthikeyan's mother
Vasu

Soundtrack

The film score and the soundtrack were composed by Deva. The soundtrack, released in 1992, features 7 tracks with lyrics written by Kalidasan.

References

External links

1992 films
Films scored by Deva (composer)
1990s Tamil-language films
Indian action drama films
Films directed by Manivannan
1990s action drama films